Long drive is a sport where players compete to hit or drive a golf ball the farthest. Top long drivers compete professionally in events and exhibitions.

Distance
Some shots in competitions surpass .

Competitors train for strength, flexibility, and speed and often perform corporate exhibitions for money, exhibiting a variety of trick shots. Ball speeds are nearly double that of an average golfer (220 mph).

Jason Zuback is perhaps the best known competitor in long drive. He is one of six people to win multiple World Long Drive Championships, with four consecutive wins from 1996 to 1999 and a fifth win in 2006; the other multiple champions are Sean Fister (1995, 2001, and 2005), Jamie Sadlowski (2008 and 2009), Joe Miller (2010 and 2016), Tim Burke (2013 and 2015) and Kyle Berkshire (2019 and 2021).

Equipment
Long drive clubs, which are always drivers, differ in several ways from consumer clubs. Until the recent club length limitation rules, the shafts were much longer than a normal  shaft, sometimes exceeding . In 2005, a  limitation was introduced (measured vertically). Long drive shafts differ from standard shafts. The main difference is greater stiffness, as a flexible shaft will lag in an inconsistent manner, causing a loss of control. These shafts are almost always made of graphite, which is lighter than steel. In order to be stiff, a shaft is usually heavier and stronger than consumer clubs. The 'kick point' or 'bend point' is also higher for a lower trajectory relative to the swing, while shaft have a lower torque, meaning that long drive clubs will not twist as much, allowing the club-head to stay straighter. In November 2016, to align them with the standard rules of golf, the World Long Drive Association further-reduced the length limitation to  —the maximum length allowed by the USGA.

Club-heads usually approach the 460 cubic centimeter limit, rarely below 400 cc. They must stay within the coefficient of restitution (COR) limit of 0.83, which measures how a ball hits off the surface. Most club-heads only approach the COR in the center of the club, so technology has allowed more area of the club to possess a COR of above 0.80. Thus, mishits are less affected by the newer clubheads. The loft of a long drive club is also much lower than a consumer club, sometimes around 4 or 5 degrees, as opposed to 10.5 degrees for an amateur's driver. The reason for lower lofted driver heads is to greatly reduce back spin. Too much back spin causes the ball to balloon or climb, creating a steep landing angle which does not allow the ball roll out. A flatter landing angle is desired to get the most out of the ball's forward velocity and energy.

Many competitions require golfers to use a specification ball for the tournament. The specific design characteristics of this ball include a dimple design that helps to maintain lower spin rates and a ball compression of 110. The average ball compression in golf varies from the mid-70s to the upper 80s.

Notable long drivers
Kyle Berkshire, World Long Drive Champion - 2019 & 2021
 Maurice Allen, World Long Drive Champion - 2018
Justin James, World Long Drive Champion - 2017 - Ranking #1 in the World was maintained until June 2019
Joe Miller, World Long Drive Champion 2010 & 2016
Tim Burke, World Long Drive Champion - 2013 & 2015
David Mobley, World Long Drive Champion – 2004 – Ranked #1 in the World by Long Drivers of America in 2003, 2004, and 2005
 Mike Austin, He was credited by Guinness World Records with hitting the longest drive in tournament play (471m/515 yards) in 1974
 Sean Fister ("The Beast"), World Long Drive Champion 1995, 2001, 2005.
 Monte Scheinblum, 1992 U.S. National and World Long Drive Champion.
 Jason Zuback ("Golfzilla"), World Long Drive Champion 1996, 1997, 1998, 1999, 2006.Seniors World Long Drive Champion 2015.
 Sandra Carlborg, Ladies Division WR holder 391,Yards World Long Drive Champion 2011,2012,2014,2015, 2017
Phillis Meti 2006, 2016 & 2018 Women's World Long Drive Champion. WR for women's longest drive 413 yards and being the youngest female World Champion 19 years, 2 months. Hit 349 yards on the WLD grid in 2008.

References

https://www.golfdigest.com/story/can-kyle-berkshire-world-long-drive-champ-make-it-to-pga-tour

Forms of golf